"You're in Love" is a song by the American heavy metal band Ratt. It is the first track on the group's 1985 album Invasion of Your Privacy, and the second single released from the record by Atlantic Records.

Background
"You're in Love" was co-written by Ratt bassist Juan Croucier and lead singer Stephen Pearcy.

Featured on Season 2 Episode 9: "Flashback" of the Freeform series, Alone Together.

Music video
The music video for the track features several love scene clips from classic movies and cartoons. The beginning of the video shows a clip from the movie Santa Fe Trail. Additionally, the video includes a scene where guitarist Robbin Crosby catches an undergarment from a female audience member after she throws it on stage.

The concert footage in the video was shot on Friday, August 9, 1985, at the Mississippi Gulf Coast Coliseum in Biloxi, and on Saturday, August 10, 1985 at the Hirsch Memorial Coliseum in Shreveport, Louisiana.

Reception
The song hit No. 89 on the Billboard and No. 34 on the Billboard Top Rock Tracks chart.

Track listing
"You're in Love" - 3:12
"Between the Eyes" - 3:54

Personnel
Stephen Pearcy - lead vocals
Warren DeMartini - co-lead guitar
Robbin Crosby - co-lead guitar
Juan Croucier - bass guitar
Bobby Blotzer - drums

Charts

References

External links
 

Ratt songs
1985 songs
1985 singles
Song recordings produced by Beau Hill
Songs written by Juan Croucier
Songs written by Stephen Pearcy
Atlantic Records singles